Natalio Cirilo Banegas (9 July 1893 - 14 May 1967), also known popularly by the nicknames Don Nata, Don Nata Banegas, Benegas and Trapiche, was an Argentine jockey, steeplechase jockey, horse trainer and owner of thoroughbred horses, an emblematic figure in the horse racing history of Argentina and of the City of Rosario during the golden age of equestrianism in the first half of the 20th century.  He received the highest national and regional statistics (scores) of Argentina.

Historical context 
To understand the scope of Natalio Cirilo Banegas' professional career historian Roy Hora in his  (History of the Argentine Horseracing) explains:   
Furthermore, Hora expounds that the evolution of horse-racing also brought the emergence of the jockey and the horse trainer

Early life 
Natalio Cirilo Banegas was born in the city of La Paz, Province of Entre Ríos, Argentina on 9 July 1893, a city located on the north-west corner of the Province of Entre Rios.  The  (Second National Census of Argentina) of 10 May 1985 found Banegas, age one, living in the city of La Paz; however, sometime soon thereafter, he moved with his family to the north-east region of Concordia Department, specifically the districts of Yeruá and Yuquerí, where his family owned land and worked in livestock and agriculture, particularly sheep farming.

Career

Buenos Aires (1906–1930)

Early career, groom (1906–1909) 
Natalio Cirilo Banegas arrived in Argentina's capital, Buenos Aires, in 1906 along with renowned thoroughbred horse trainer Francisco Maschio, who was a close family friend and neighbor of his from his native Province of Entre Ríos.  Maschio became a mentor and later a colleague.  
Once in Buenos Aires, Banegas was schooled by trainer Mr. Juan Concepción at the stables Mr. Concepción owned in the Bajo de Belgrano section of the City of Buenos Aires.  At Mr. Concepción's stable he started working as a groom continuing his training in equestrianism as both a jockey's apprentice and a thoroughbred horse trainer's apprentice.  Banegas regarded  Mr. Concepción as ". . . the only boss he ever had."

Jockey (1909–1912) 

In 1909 he obtained a license to compete as a flat race jockey (see Horse Racing 2.1) debuting with Entrevero, a horse under the training of Mr. Elías Zamora, at the Hipódromo de Belgrano (Belgrano Hippodrome).

The Hippodrome of Belgrano, also known as the Hipódromo Nacional (National Hippodrome) and Hipódromo Nacional Presidente General Bosch (National Hippodrome President General Bosch), was a racecourse active from 1887 until 1913 which officiated as the counterpart and competitor of the Hipódromo Argentino (Argentine Hippodrome) presently the Hipódromo Nacional de Palermo (National Hippodrome of Palermo).

His first victory in 1909 was with Absalón, a thoroughbred from the Stable Los Pinos and a brother of Rubicela, with which he won the 1,400 meters race and a subsequent race defeating the legendary dappled thoroughbred Realista from the stables of trainer Mr. Juan Coll, which was ridden by jockey Pedro Claverie.

Banegas third victory was with Ilota trained by Mr. Tellería with which he won another ten races.  From then on he became one of the leading Argentine jockeys of his time winning at the Hipódromo Nacional (National Hippodrome) race season 1909-1910 an unprecedented statistic of 80 times.  Other horses ridden by Banegas during that season were: Florentiona, Solway, Fastidio and L'Emperur, among others.

That season he later debuted at the Palermo Hippodrome (then National Hippodrome) ridding Bonzo with which he won a second place followed also by a second place with Proserpine.

Steeplechase Jockey (1912–1915) 

It was in 1912 when Natalio Cirilo Banegas established himself as the leading Argentine steeplechase jockey, winning thirteen out of the twenty five events he competed in that year, including races at the hippodromes of San Martín, Palermo and Longchamps.  Among some significant horses he steeplechased in 1912 were: Cogote, Oskold, Brezo (owned by Mr. Andrés Guadalupe) with which he won four victories and Quillay.

By mid-1913 Banegas had won three out of the seven events in which he had participated, not only in Buenos Aires but also in the city of San Miguel de Tucumán, riding among others: Soldier Boy, Old Fellow, El Solo, Más o Menos and Quillay.

On 8 January 1913 during a race Banegas suffered a fall in a jump riding Quillay, which caused him a grave brain concussion and left him unable for fifteen days.  Quillay was the offspring of Le Samaritain and Melena, two famous champions and breeders of champions, under the care of trainer Mr. Felipe Viscay.

Banegas continued competing as a steeplechase jockey after the accident into 1914, his last recorded victory being in September 1914 with Más o Menos; afterwards, he transitioned to a career as one of the most successful thoroughbred trainers of Argentina.

Horse trainer, Buenos Aires (1915–1930) 

Natalio Cirilo Banegas trained horses mostly for races at the Palermo Hippodrome (Hipódromo Argentino de Palermo) and at the San Isidro Hippodrome (Hipódromo de San Isidro) of the City of Buenos Aires as well as for the Hippodrome of the City of La Plata in the Province of Buenos Aires.  Banegas was associated with the leading thoroughbred horse breeding farms of Argentina, among them Stable Condal, owned by Mr. Fernando Sanjurjo, owner of the cigarette factory Condal and Staple Chapadmalal, owned by brothers Miguel and Jose A. Martinez de Hoz.

Historian Roy Hora indicates in Historia del Turf Argentino (History of the Argentine Horse-racing), in reference to the impact of the economic crisis of the 1930s on Argentine horse-racing and in particular on the Palermo Hippodrome, that ". . .the Jockey Club launched the construction of a stadium of its own.  The work began in 1926, but the Crisis of the Thirties delayed the opening until December of 1935".  During this period, Hora explains, "several racecourses in the interior of the country also became more prominent, including. . . Rosario."

The end of 20s and beginning of the 30s found Natalio Cirilo Banegas expanding his professional activity to the City of Rosario, Santa Fe Province training horses for races at the Hipódromo Parque de La Independencia (Independence Park Hippodrome), former Rosario Jockey Club's Racecourse.  He definitively settled in Rosario at the beginning of the thirties and from then on, until the end of his career, he trained horses mostly for races at the Independence Park Hippodrome of Rosario and at the Palermo Hippodrome of Buenos Aires.

Rosario (1930–1967)

Horse trainer, Rosario – Buenos Aires (1930–1967) 

Natalio Cirilo Banegas stood out as a trainer of horses for long distance races (3000 meters and 4000 meters), winning the most important prizes and classics and obtaining the highest horse-racing statistics (scores) of his time in Rosario.  Among some prizes and classics won by Banegas were: the President of the Republic Prize, the Classic Pueyrredón, Grand Prize Carlos Pellegrini and the Classic Alfredo A. and Oscar P. Casas Prize.

Famous thoroughbreds under the training of Banegas included: Hollis, a horse with which Banegas won the President of the Republic Prize, the Classic Pueyrredón and the Grand Prize Carlos Pellegrini, the latter victory with Hollis, on 11 November 1936, was a 3,000 meter race and was won in the record time of 3 minutes 7 seconds.

Bravio was another thoroughbred horse with which he once again won the President of the Republic Prize on 9 July 1939; Mantillo still another, which he won additionally the Classic Alfredo A. and Oscar P. Casas on 28 July 1960; and Chillido, from Stable La Estrella, a horse that Natalio Cirilo Banegas shared in partnership with Francisco H. Landó Esq., and with which he received multiple prizes.

Press headlines praised Banegas' professional success.  His fame, popularized by the accounts such as El diestro entrenador de Bavio (Bravio's skilled trainer), La jornada de ayer alcanzó números eloquentes (Yesterday's ticket reached eloquent numbers), Batacazo!(Blockbuster!).

Natalio Cirilo Banegas was the owner of the Stable Asegún and he was also in charge of the Stable Sarmiento, owned by his wife Mrs. Angela Bandoni (Rosario, Argentina 10 May 1907 – 11 August 1985).  Sarmiento Stable's jockey jacket is remembered for its beauty and delicate design, an original creation of Mrs. Banegas, made with a Scottish tartan fabric of beige tones on the front and back, with white sleeves and a cap of the same Scottish tartan fabric with a white visor.

Later years 

The later years were crowned with multiple wins including those with Saint Nichols; Martinica, a mare from Stable JSR and Rimado, a short distance thoroughbred race horse. Natalio Cirilo Banegas envisioned that his profession as a thoroughbred horse trainer would become a family tradition.  Consequently, his son Prof. Oscar Banegas, following in his father's professional footsteps, on 25 June 1961 won the prestigious Alfonso de la Fuente y Chai Prize with Monaca, a dappled mare ridden by jockey Jose Figueroa, this being the last great equestrian victory recorded by the Banegas family which occurred during the decline of equestrianism in Argentina.

Referring back to the valuable information provided by historian Roy Hora in his Historia del Turf Argentino (History of the Argentine Horse-racing) 

For the history of horse-racing in Argentina and of the City of Rosario, Natalio Cirilo Banegas left a legacy as a legendary jockey and trainer and left his family with a tradition for professional excellence, though not in the training of thoroughbred horses, but in teaching, in the case his son Prof. Oscar Banegas, in medicine in the case of his grandson Dr. Rodrigo Natalio Banegas and in classical music in the case of his grandson Fabio L. Banegas.  Both grandsons, twins, have taken his surname and his example of excellence to international recognition.  Natalio Cirilo Banegas died in the City of Rosario on 14 May 1967.

Carlos Gardel 

During his long career, Natalio Cirilo Banegas enjoyed the friendship of the foremost personalities of the Argentine equestrian world.  Among them was his close friend, the legendary tango singer, composer and actor Carlos Gardel (1890 – 1935), with whom Banegas had a friendship that began before the start of Gardel's artistic life and spanned for more than a quarter of a century.

 
The friendship between Carlos Gardel and Natalio Cirilo Banegas traced back to the time when Banegas was part of the group of close friendships Gardel had with jockey Irineo Leguisamo and trainer Francisco Maschio, also one of Banegas' mentors.  According to Simon Collier in The Life, Music and Times of Carlos Gardel "Maschio's stable named Yeruá, on Olleros Street, was, for Gardel the focus of an alternative barra (group of friends or fans), as strong as any other he ever associated with over the years.

In his last performance in the City of Rosario, on 21–22 April 1933, at the Broadway Theater Carlos Gardel gifted Natalio Cirilo Banegas with one of his gaucho jackets, made with a black satin and embroidered with red roses.  Gardel was photographed wearing this jacket by photographer José María Silva in 1923 and he wore it afterwards in his 1923 concert tour of Spain for 40 performances at the Apollo Theater of Madrid, one of which was attended by one of the Spanish Infantas, Infanta Isabel de Borbón y Borbón, "La Chata."

A similar gaucho jacket to the one Banegas received from Gardel appeared in films and movie posters as The Tango on Broadway of 1934 and El día que me quieras of 1935.  This jacket was also worn alternatively in El día que me quieras by actors Tito Luciardo and Manuel Peluffo.  In one of such scenes they sang the tango Suerte Negra in a trio with Carlos Cardel.  Carlos Cardel died tragically on 24 June 1935,

Colleagues

Horse trainers 
Natalio Cirilo Banegas maintained close friendships with his colleagues, among them the trainers: Juan Concepción, Francisco Maschio, Naciamo Moreno, Elías Zamora, Tellería, Felipe Viscay, Andrés Guadalupe, Anacleto Galimbertti, Anibal "Chiquito" Giovanetti, Della Randart and Lora.

As the leading thoroughbred horse trainer of his time in the City of Rosario, he mentored and earned the esteem of many colleagues, such as Cecilio Rodriguez, Agapito Gomez, Arturo Capra, Antonio Lema, Carlos "Gallego" Varela, Miranda, Agud, Demarchi, Alonso and the Toledo brothers.

Jockeys 

Among the jockeys who rode horses prepared by Natalio Cirilo Banegas some of whom became his close friends were: Irineo Leguisamo, Ramón Pelletier, Domingo "Mingo" Torterolo, Francisco Arcuri, Máximo Acosta, José Candal, Manuel Lema, Roberto Carabajal, Sebastián Ruíz, and Cayetano Santos "Pochi" Sauro, all active in the hippodromes of the city of Buenos Aires.

In the City of Rosario his horses were ridden among others by the following jockeys: Angel Oscar Baratucci, Félix Tomas Rodríguez, Nicasio Rubén "Machadito" Machado – riding among others Mantillo–, Oreste A. Cosenza and the brothers Jorge and Tito Mernies. 
  
It is worth mentioning that both Cayetano Santos Sauro and Nicasio Rubén Machado came from the same equestrian school as Banegas, and likewise, they started first as grooms in the stables of Belgrano, then became jockey apprentices and finally horse-race jockey champions.

With respect to Angel Oscar Baratucci, on 15 December 1957, he won at the Independence Hippodrome in the City of Rosario all eight races programmed on that date, thus entering the Guinness Book of World Records, displacing Irineo Leguizamo himself, who held the highest mark of seven races won in one day.  Regarding Cayetano Sauro, who was also one of the most renowned jockeys of his time, his career was cut short after an accident he suffered on 15 February 1969 at the San Isidro Racecourse.

Horse owner 

Natalio Cirilo Banegas was sole owner of many thoroughbred horse champions as was the case with Rimado and he trained horses, often in partnerships, with then influential thoroughbred horse owners.  Worth citing are: Mr. Fernando Sanjurjo, owner of the Cigarette Factory Condal and thoroughbred Horse Farm Condal; Mr. Marcel Baurin, shareholder of the automobile company Peugeot and landowner; Messrs. Roberto, Bartolo, Miguel and Fernando Monserrat, owners of Monserrat Bank Ltd., substantial real-estate holders and businessmen in the City of Rosario.

Additionally Banegas trained horses for Mr. Inri Jesus Araya de Avenada, landowner and founder of Inriville, a town in the Province of Córdoba, businessmen 'Mr. Santiago Palma and Mr. Pedro Claverie; industrialist Mr. Miguel Angel Langelotti and Mr. Juan Francisco Rosetti, Lottery Concessionaire of the Province of Santa Fe and also owner of the Stable JFR.

Among political personas of the time, he trained horses for Mr. Francisco H. Landó Esq., Minister of Education of the Province of Santa Fe and Mr. Svetkov, the Acting Mayor of the City of Rosario. Mr. Svetkov was also the godfather of his youngest son Prof. Oscar Banegas.

References 

Horse trainers
1893 births
1967 deaths